The 1980 Tanduay Esquires season was the sixth season of the franchise in the Philippine Basketball Association (PBA).

Occurrences
Tanduay's seven-foot import Paul Zaretsky sprained his ankle in a workout and as a result, Tanduay lost their first game of the season to Honda, playing with only one import, Kevin Cluess. Zaretsky never got a chance to play and was sent home in favor of 6-8 Odell Ball, a former center of Marquette University.

Semifinal stint
For the third straight season, Tanduay advances into the round of four of the league's most prestigious tournament, the All-Filipino. The Esquires posted a 5-4 and 3-2 won-loss slates in the eliminations and quarterfinal phase. In the one-round robin among the four semifinalist, the Esquires lost to unbeaten Crispa Redmanizers, 98-101, in the last playing date on December 4 as they failed to create a three-way tie and a playoff with Toyota for the second finals berth. Tanduay placed third by winning their series against Gilbey's Gin.

Won-loss record vs Opponents

Roster

References

Tanduay
Tanduay Rhum Masters seasons